John Harrington (1589–1654) was an English politician who sat in the House of Commons from 1645.

Harrington was the son of Sir John Harrington, of Kelston, Somerset. He matriculated at Trinity College, Oxford on 7 December 1604 aged 15. He migrated to Cambridge University where he was incorporated in 1607. He was called to the bar at Lincoln's Inn in 1615. In 1645, Harrington was elected Member of Parliament for Somerset as a recruiter to the Long Parliament. His election was declared void in April 1646 and he was re-elected MP for Somerset in July 1646. He was secluded under Pride's Purge in December 1648. He was treasurer of his Inn in 1651.

Harrington died between 21 April 1654 when he made his will and 31 May 1654. He was the father of John who was also an MP.

References

1589 births
1654 deaths
English MPs 1640–1648
Alumni of Trinity College, Oxford
Alumni of the University of Cambridge
Members of Lincoln's Inn
Politicians from Somerset
John